Eczemotes is a genus of longhorn beetles of the subfamily Lamiinae, containing the following species:

 Eczemotes affinis Breuning, 1968
 Eczemotes atomaria Pascoe, 1864
 Eczemotes cerviniapex Heller, 1914
 Eczemotes granulosa Breuning, 1938
 Eczemotes guttulata Bates, 1877
 Eczemotes saintaignani Breuning, 1982
 Eczemotes transversefasciata Breuning, 1940
 Eczemotes undata (Montrouzier, 1855)

References

Pteropliini